Events in the year 2017 in the Marshall Islands.

Incumbents
President: Hilda Heine
Speaker of the house: Kenneth Kedi

Events
21 February – 2017 Marshallese Constitutional Convention election

Deaths

7 August – Mattlan Zackhras, politician and diplomat (b. 1970).
22 August – Tony deBrum, politician and government minister (b 1945)

References

 
2010s in the Marshall Islands
Years of the 21st century in the Marshall Islands
Marshall Islands
Marshall Islands